Godda College, established in 1954, is a general degree college in Godda, Jharkhand, India. It offers undergraduate and postgraduate courses in arts, commerce and sciences. It is affiliated to  Sido Kanhu Murmu University. Godda College was accredited by the National Assessment and Accreditation Council (NAAC).

See also
Education in India
Literacy in India
List of institutions of higher education in Jharkhand

References

External links
http://goddacollege.org/

Colleges affiliated to Sido Kanhu Murmu University
Universities and colleges in Jharkhand
Deoghar district
Educational institutions established in 1954
1954 establishments in Bihar